Snap Lake Airport  is located near the Snap Lake Diamond Mine, Northwest Territories, Canada. The Magnetic Variation from 2016 is 15° East.

References

Registered aerodromes in the North Slave Region